Streptococcus vestibularis is a species of Streptococcus.

Streptococcus vestibularis, member of the viridans streptococci was first isolated from vestibular mucosa of human oral cavities, was described as a new species in 1988. It is noted that “Streptococcus vestibularis is a normal inhabitant of vestibules of the human oral cavity” (Haberal, Ozdemir, Siren, & Simsek, 2008)

References

External links
Type strain of Streptococcus vestibularis at BacDive -  the Bacterial Diversity Metadatabase

Streptococcaceae
Gram-positive bacteria